West Cornforth railway station served the village of West Cornforth, County Durham, England, from 1866 to 1952 on the Great North of England, Clarence and Hartlepool Junction Railway.

History 
The station was opened as Thrislington in August 1866 by the York, Newcastle and Berwick Railway. Its name was changed to West Cornforth on 1 July 1891. It closed on 9 June 1952.

References 

Disused railway stations in County Durham
Railway stations in Great Britain opened in 1866
Railway stations in Great Britain closed in 1952
1866 establishments in England
1952 disestablishments in England